Jante may refer to:

Jante Law, a code of conduct said to be common in Nordic countries
Jante, Nepal, a village